"Je m'appelle Bagdad" is the second single to be released from Tina Arena's fifth studio album Un autre univers. It is a ballad with various orientalist themes. The song received significant airplay on French radio as did its predecessor "Aimer jusqu'à l'impossible".

Arena is quoted as saying the song's title, which roughly translates as "My Name Is Bagdad", is misleading. "This is not a political song and it’s not about a political subject. It’s a metaphor - like a poem. It’s a woman saying ... I was once beautiful and now I’m in ruins, I’m destroyed."

Track listing
CD single
"Je m'appelle Bagdad" (David Gategno, Elodie Hesme) – 4:19
"Si j'avais le temps" (Tina Arena, Patrick Fiori, Vincent Hare) – 4:11
"Je m'appelle Bagdad (Remix)" (Gategno, Hesme) – 3:50

Music video
The video for the song was filmed in February 2006 in the Tunisian desert and the Palace of Tozeur by Thierry Vergnes, who also directed the video for "Aimer jusqu'à l'impossible". About the video, Arena said, "There's always pressure to make a beautiful video but I really wanted tell the story of how complex humans are and how they can both create and destroy beautiful things." An Iraqi orthodontist living in France has also created a video, hosted on YouTube, of the song.

Charts and certifications

Weekly charts

Year-end charts

Certifications

References

2006 singles
French-language songs
Tina Arena songs